Nathaniel Ray Allen (born November 30, 1987) is a former American football safety. He was drafted by the Philadelphia Eagles in the second round of the 2010 NFL Draft. He played college football at South Florida. He has also played for the Oakland Raiders and the Miami Dolphins.

Early years
Allen played football for the Pop Warner Little Scholars. He was part of the SE Region, Peace River Conference, and played with the Cape Coral High School Seahawks. 
Allen attended Cape Coral High School, where he played quarterback and threw for more than 5,000 career yards. He was a three-time all-area player and Class 5A honorable mention all-state as a junior and senior. Also an accomplished basketball player, he averaged 15.3 points, 6.6 rebounds and 2.9 steals in 2005–2006 and was named 2nd Team All-Area. He was also a letterman in track.

Considered a two-star recruit by Rivals.com, Allen was not ranked among the nation's best football prospects. He drew little attention from colleges and selected South Florida over Eastern Kentucky and Eastern Michigan.

College career
As a true freshman, Allen played in nine of USF's 13 games, missing four mid-year games due to a quadriceps injury. He was used as a situational backup in the secondary and also on special teams.

Becoming a full-time starter as a sophomore, Allen had a breakout year, recording 84 tackles (fourth on the team), four interceptions, three fumble recoveries, 47 fumble return yards, and one touchdown. He was named Nagurski National Defensive Player of the Week after forcing a fumble, recovering a fumble and intercepting a pass in Bulls’ win at No. 17 Auburn.

A preseason Thorpe Award candidate in 2008, Allen finished the season fifth on the team with 53 tackles, while having two tackles for loss, one sack and one interception.

Professional career
Allen was considered one of the best safety prospects available for the 2010 NFL Draft.

Philadelphia Eagles
Allen was drafted by the Philadelphia Eagles in the second round (37th overall) in the 2010 NFL Draft. The Eagles traded quarterback Donovan McNabb to the Washington Redskins in exchange for the pick used to select Allen. After Marlin Jackson suffered an Achilles tendon rupture during organized team activities, Allen was named the starting free safety going into training camp, replacing the 2009 starter, Sean Jones. Allen was signed to a four-year contract on July 27, 2010.

Allen recorded his first NFL interception against the Green Bay Packers in week 1 of the 2010 season, and he recorded his second interception week 2 against the Detroit Lions. He was named the NFL Defensive Rookie of the Month for the month of September. He was placed on injured reserve on December 21 due to a torn patellar tendon.

Allen entered free agency after the 2013 season. He re-signed with the Eagles on a one-year deal. Entering 2014, Allen was listed as a starter at safety opposite Malcolm Jenkins. Although he led the team with 4 interceptions, the Eagles did not re-sign Allen.

Oakland Raiders
Allen signed with the Oakland Raiders on March 12, 2015. Allen suffered a torn MCL in a loss to the Cincinnati Bengals on September 13, 2015. After an impressive preseason where he only allowed 1 catch on 5 targets, he played only 5 games in the regular season, totalling 11 tackles and 1 interception. He was released by the Raiders on February 9, 2016. Allen was re-signed by the Raiders on February 11, 2016. In the 2016 season, he recorded 33 tackles, 2 interceptions, and 3 pass deflections in 14 games and 4 starts.

Miami Dolphins
On March 10, 2017, Allen signed with the Miami Dolphins. He started the first seven games at free safety before being placed on injured reserve on October 31, 2017 with a calf injury.

Career statistics

Personal life 
After retiring from football, Allen became a firefighter with North Collier Fire Control and Rescue in Collier County, Florida.

References

External links
Oakland Raiders bio
Philadelphia Eagles bio
South Florida Bulls football bio

1987 births
Living people
Sportspeople from Fort Myers, Florida
Players of American football from Florida
American football safeties
South Florida Bulls football players
Philadelphia Eagles players
Oakland Raiders players
Miami Dolphins players